Bellevue is a city in Clay County, Texas, United States. It is part of the Wichita Falls metropolitan statistical area. The population was 362 at the 2010 census.

History 
The sparsely settled area developed around 1882 by the Ortons, when it was selected as a railroad shipping station. The community has had several declines and resurges. In 1902, the community incorporated, but then it was almost wiped out by a tornado in 1906. Now it is a small growing town.

Geography

Bellevue is located in southeastern Clay County at  (33.635221, –98.015609).

Demographics

As of the census of 2010, there were 362 people, 140 households, and 105 families residing in the city. The population density was 430.1 people per square mile (166.0/km2). There were 161 housing units at an average density of 191.3 per square mile (73.8/km2). The racial makeup of the city was 97.24% White, 0.55% African American, 0.83% Native American, 0.83% from other races, and 0.55% from two or more races. Hispanic or Latino of any race were 1.93% of the population.

There were 140 households, out of which 35.0% had children under the age of 18 living with them, 57.1% were married couples living together, 11.4% had a female householder with no husband present, 6.4% had a male householder with no wife present, and 25.0% were non-families. 21.4% of all households were made up of individuals, and 12.1% had someone living alone who was 65 years of age or older. The average household size was 2.59 and the average family size was 2.94.

In the city, the population was spread out, with 24.6% under the age of 18, 5.2% from 18 to 24, 24.9% from 25 to 44, 28.5% from 45 to 64, and 16.9% who were 65 years of age or older. The median age was 44.4 years. For every 100 females, there were 102.2 males. For every 100 females age 18 and over, there were 93.6 males.

The median income for a household in the city was $32,813, and the median income for a family was $46,250. Males had a median income of $51,000 versus $50,000 for females. The per capita income for the city was $21,645. About 17.7% of families and 20.7% of the population were below the poverty line, including 28.6% of those under age 18 and 24.5% of those age 65 or over.

Education
Bellevue is served by the Bellevue Independent School District.

Climate
The climate in this area is characterized by hot, humid summers and generally mild to cool winters.  According to the Köppen Climate Classification system, Bellevue has a humid subtropical climate, abbreviated "Cfa" on climate maps.

References

External links
 See historic photos of Bellevue from the Clay County Historical Society, hosted by the Portal to Texas History
 Texas handbook: Bellevue

Cities in Texas
Cities in Clay County, Texas
Wichita Falls metropolitan area
Populated places established in 1882